Peter Keays (born 4 September 1955) is a former Australian rules footballer who played with Melbourne and Fitzroy in the Victorian Football League (VFL).

Notes

External links 		
		
		
		
		
		
		
1955 births
Living people
Australian rules footballers from Victoria (Australia)		
Melbourne Football Club players		
Fitzroy Football Club players